Yate railway station serves the town of Yate in South Gloucestershire, in south west England. The station is located on the main Bristol to Birmingham line between Bristol Parkway and Cam & Dursley, and is operated by Great Western Railway.

History

The Yate station first opened on 8 July 1844 and closed on 4 January 1965, along with other wayside stations on the former Bristol and Gloucester Railway; the local stopping service on the route having been withdrawn as a result of the Beeching Axe. This had both its platforms on the southern side of the road bridge mentioned above - the original 1844 goods shed still stands (now in commercial use) next to the old southbound platform site. The station was reopened by British Rail on 11 May 1989 with the backing of Avon County Council.

The new connection left the older line by means a flying junction at Yate South before heading southwest to join the SWML at the triangular Westerleigh Junction. Though jointly built by the two companies for the purpose of giving the GWR access to the Severn Rail Bridge and Severn and Wye Railway, it also provided an alternative route to Bristol Temple Meads via Filton and the Great Western soon made use of it to compete with the Midland for Bristol to Birmingham traffic, much to the dismay of the latter company. All services now use this newer line to get to Bristol, as the original 1844 route through  was abandoned in January 1970 following the completion of the Bristol area resignalling scheme. A short section of the old route was retained from Yate South Junction after the rest closed, to serve a domestic waste transfer depot and fuel oil distribution terminal at Westerleigh sidings. This line is still in use today.

It is the junction station for the Thornbury Branchline, however the passenger stations on this branch have long since closed (trains ceased in 1944) and the line remained open to serve Tytherington Quarry until September 2013, when it was placed 'Out of Use' by Network Rail following the mothballing of the quarry at the beginning of the year. The line has now (summer 2017) returned to use following the reopening of the quarry, with Mendip Rail running periodic stone trains.

In the Strategic Rail Authority’s 2007/08 financial year, Yate was ranked as the 1104th most-used station in the UK. In the Office of Rail and Road's 2019/20 estimations, Yate ranked 1,114th most used station.

Facilities
The station is staffed on weekday mornings. It has two staggered platforms, separated by the A432 road bridge.  An automated ticket machine was installed in mid-2007, but stopped functioning due to vandalism and is reported to be "unlikely to be replaced in the foreseeable future". A new ticket machine was installed in 2013 on platform 1, whilst the portakabin ticket office is on the opposite platform.  Digital information screens, customer help points and timetable posters provide train running information, whilst CCTV was installed here in 2011.  Step-free access to both platforms is available (via ramps from the road bridge to platform 1).

Services 

There have been proposals put forward to run additional services to/from Bristol as part of the second phase of the Greater Bristol Metro plans first put forward in 2008 and rebranded as "MetroWest" in 2013. If implemented the station would become the new northern terminus of the current  to  local service, though this would not happen until after Phase 1 of the scheme is completed in 2019.

Yate station is also served by a two-hourly Sunday service. A normal service operates on most bank holidays.

References

External links
Friends of Yate Station site
Yate Heritage Centre's page "Victorians and Yate's Railway"

Former Midland Railway stations
Railway stations in Bristol, Bath and South Gloucestershire
Railway stations in Great Britain opened in 1844
Railway stations in Great Britain closed in 1965
Railway stations in Great Britain opened in 1989
Railway stations served by Great Western Railway
Beeching closures in England
1844 establishments in England
1965 disestablishments in England
1989 establishments in England
Reopened railway stations in Great Britain
DfT Category F1 stations